Fosselman's Ice Cream Company is a historic ice cream company based in Alhambra, California, located at 1824 W. Main Street, that has been owned and operated by the same family for three generations. Although the present company was started in 1937, the company can trace it roots to a related family business founded in 1919.

History
In 1919, Christian Anthony Fosselman created Fosselman's, Inc., to manufacture ice cream in Waverly, Iowa. Five years later, Fosselman relocated with his family to Southern California to found a wholesale dairy business in Pasadena, called Fosselman Creamery that also delivered milk, butter, cream, and ice cream directly to families in the San Gabriel Valley through a fleet of company-owned trucks.

In 1937, Fosselman sold the creamery and started an ice cream shop in South Pasadena called Fosselman's Ice Cream Company that made ice cream on the premise. Additional storefronts were opened in Highland Park (1941), and Glendale, with a production facility in Alhambra. All but the Alhambra location, also an ice cream parlor, closed in the 1970s. Also in the 1970s, Jelly Belly creator David Klein rented a part of Fosselman's to promote and sell his jelly beans, then in their nascence.

Since the 1980s, Fosselman brothers John and Chris, grandsons of founder Christian, have run the company. The company also supplies product to approximately 500 outlets, from "high-end restaurants to food trucks to retirement homes."

In 2015, the company introduced soft serve ice cream, soft serve custard, and milkshakes as part of its repertoire. In 2019, Fosselman's opened a new branch, called The Ice Cream Shop, in Glendora.

Products
In addition to producing and carrying such classic ice cream flavors as chocolate, vanilla, and strawberry, Fosselman's also features exotic flavors such as taro, ube, and lychee, a nod to the majority Asian population in Alhambra. Some seasonal flavors include fresh peach, sweet corn elote, and watermelon sorbet. Previous flavors include black sesame, dulche de leche, horchata, matcha green tea, oaxacan chocolate and red bean.

Reviews
The Los Angeles Times called Fosselman's "the Alhambra emperors of ice cream". The British newspaper The Guardian called Fosselman's the "Best place to drink: Milkshakes".

References

External links
 
 Video: Fosselman’s celebrates its 100th year making ice cream via The San Diego Union-Tribune

Ice cream parlors in the United States
Ice cream brands
American companies established in 1919